This page describe all the 2007 seasons of Formula Renault series.

Calendar
This table indicate the round number of each Formula Renault series according to weekend dates. The dark note indicate Winter Series.

Formula Renault 3.5L

Formula Renault 2.0L

2007 Formula Renault 2.0 Eurocup season

2007 Championnat de France Formula Renault 2.0 season
The 2007 season was the last of the French Formula Renault championship as independent series. It was included in 2008 in the Formula Renault 2.0 West European Cup. The last round of the French championship was held out of France, in the Circuit de Catalunya, Barcelona as symbol of the series mutations that expand to Western Europe (Portugal, Spain, France and Belgium) in 2008.

Point system : 15, 12, 10, 8, 6, 5, 4, 3, 2, 1. In each race 1 point for Fastest lap and 1 for Pole position.
Races : 2 race by rounds (first between 60 and 80 km, second between 20 and 30 minutes).

A Rookie (R) and Challenger Cup (C) classifications are also established for newcomers and young drivers.

 (1) = Pierre Combot race for Pole Service until Cram Competition in Magny-Cours WSR and Catalunya and Graff Racing in Magny-Cours.
 (2) = Alexander Sims race for Manor Competition since Val de Vienne round.
 (3) = Alex Morgan race for Manor Competition during Magny-Cours WSR event and for Fortec Motorsport during Catalunya round.
 (4) = Nicolas Marroc race for TCS Racing since Magny-Cours WSR event.

2007 Formula Renault 2.0 UK season

2007 Formula Renault 2.0 UK Winter Cup
The Formula Renault UK Winter Cup and Formula Renault BARC Winter Cup are held in same time, but with separated classification. Some drivers take part of the UK Winter Cup but are not eligible to score points as a non-MSA licence holder.
Point system : 32, 28, 25, 22, 20, 18, 16, 14, 12, 11, 10, 9, 8, 7, 6, 5, 4, 3, 2, 1. In each race 1 point for Fastest lap, 1 point for Pole position.
2 races in each round between 30 miles and 30 minutes.

2007 Formula Renault BARC FR2000 season
The season include 12 rounds in 8 venues. The final standing was established with the best 11 results of the season. A Club Class classification is also established for young drivers (see 2007 Formula Renault BARC Club Class season below), they participe on the same race as the FR2000 series
Point system : 15, 12, 10, 8, 6, 5, 4, 3, 2, 1. In each race 1 point for Fastest lap and 1 point for Pole position.
Races are between 30 miles and 30 minutes.

 (1) = Points include only the best 11 results.
 (2) = Felix Fisher race for Quantexe Racing since Round 7

2007 Formula Renault BARC Club Class season
The season include 12 rounds in 8 venues. The final standing was established with the best 11 results of the season. The Club Class category is raced in same time as the main Formula Renault BARC FR2000 series. The cars use Tatuus RC (97/98/99) or Mygale SJ99 chassis and are powered by Renault Laguna 2.0L 6 valves engine providing lower Horsepower than the FR2000 class.
 Point system : 15, 12, 10, 8, 6, 5, 4, 3, 2, 1. In each race 1 point for Fastest lap and 1 point for Pole position.
 Races are between 30 miles and 30 minutes.

2007 Formula Renault BARC Winter Cup
The Formula Renault BARC Winter Cup and Formula Renault UK Winter Cup are held in same time, but with separated classification.
Point system : 15, 12, 10, 8, 6, 5, 4, 3, 2, 1. In each race 1 point for Fastest lap, 1 point for Pole position.
2 races in each round between 30 miles and 30 minutes.

2007 Formula Renault 2.0 Italia season
Point system : 32, 28, 24, 22, 20, 18, 16, 14, 12, 10, 8, 6, 4, 2, 1 for 15th. In each race 2 points for Fastest lap and 2 for Pole position.
Races : 2 race by rounds length of 30 minutes each.

2007 Formula Renault 2.0 Italia Winter Series
César Ramos realize the perfect Winter Series with 4 wins, 4 Pole positions and 4 fastest laps.
The same point system is used with 2 points for Fasted lap and 2 points for Pole position.

2007 Formula Renault 2.0 Northern European Cup season

2007 LO Formule Renault 2.0 Suisse season
Point system : 25, 22, 20, 18, 16, 14, 12, 10, 8, 6, 5, 4, 3, 2, 1 for 15th. Extra 2 points for Fastest lap and 3 points for Pole position.
Races : 2 race by rounds.

 (1) = Francisco Viel Bugliotto was penalized and receive only 2 points for its 5th.

2007 Formula Renault 2000 de America season
Point system : 30, 24, 20, 16, 12, 10, 8, 6, 4, 2 for 10th. Extra 2 points for Fastest lap and 2 points for Pole position.

On May 13, a race in El Salvador and on January 27, 2008, a race in Puebla, Mexico were planned but cancelled.

2007 Formula TR 2000 Pro Series season
Point system : 30, 28, 26, 24, 22, 20, 18, 16, 14, 12, 10, 8, 6, 4, 2, 2, 2, 2, 2, 2 for 20th. Extra 1 point for Fastest lap and 1 point for Pole position. The points system change since Round 13 :
The points are double in Round 13 and 14 as: 60, 56, 52, 48, 44, 40, 36, 32, 28, 20, 16, 12, 8, 4, 4, 4, 4, 4, 4 for 20th and 2 for fastest lap, 2 for Pole position.
 Rounds since 15: ?.
All entry driver receive 1 point in each venue if they register five days before race.
Races : 2 race by rounds. Each race length of 9 to 16 laps and use rolling start.

 (b) = No Bonus point for late registering.

2007 Asian Formula Renault Challenge season
Point system : 30, 24, 20, 17, 15, 13, 11, 9, 7, 5, 4, 3, 2, 1. No points for Fastest lap or Pole position. Drivers that race less than 5 rounds don't receive any points for the final standing. The team point attribution is different from the driver point system : 10, 8, 6, 5, 4, 3, 2, 1.
Races : 2 races by rounds.

The Asian Challenge Category (A) reward the best asian driver. The China Formula Renault Challenge (C) reward the best driver including only rounds held on China. The table indicate the final position of the race including all drivers and categories but total points are based on results according to participating categories of each driver.

Formula Renault 1.6L

2007 Championnat de France FFSA Formule Campus Renault Elf season
This is the last season of the Championnat de France Formule Campus Renault Elf replaced by Formul’Academy Euro Series in 2008.
Point system : ?

2007 Formula Renault 1.6 Belgium season
The Belgian series is held on 6 venues, 2 races by venues. In 2007, the championship use Zolder (venue 1, 2 and 4), Dijon-Prenois (venue 3) and Spa (venues 5 and 6) circuits. Each round duration is 20 minutes.
Point system : 20, 17, 15, 13, 11, 10, 9, 8, 7, 6, 5, 4, 3, 2, 1 for 15th. Extra 1 point for Fastest lap and 2 points for Pole position.

2007 Formula Renault 1.6 Argentina season
The cars use various chassis like Tito or Tulia. The contest consists of 13 races on 13 different venues : Comodoro Rivadavia, Parque Ciudad, Autódromo Ezequiel Crisol, Autódromo Jorge Ángel Pena, El Zonda - Eduardo Copello, Autódromo Oscar Cabalén, Callejero de Santa Fe, Las Paredes, Viedma, Autódromo Oscar Alfredo Gálvez, Oberá, Autódromo Rosendo Hernández and the last in Circuito callejero de Punta del Este, Uruguay.
Point system : 20, 15, 12, 10, 8, 6, 4, 3, 2, 1 for 10th. 1 extra point for Pole position.

2007 PanamGPSeries Formula 1600 Junior season
The PanamGPSeries Formula 1600 Junior is held with the Formula de America 2000 on the same 9 races. The same point system is used.

2007 Formula TR 1600 Pro Series season
The Formula TR 1600 Pro Series is held with the Formula TR 2000 Pro Series on 20 rounds. The same point system is used.

Other Formulas powered by Renault championships
This section resume unofficial and/or renault engine supplier formulas series.

2007 GP2 Series seasons

The GP2 Series are powered by 4 liters, V8 Renault engine and Bridgestone tyres with a Dallara chassis.

2007 Austria Formel Renault Cup season
This is the first season of this series using Formula Renault 2.0L. The season is held on 10 races.
Point system: 20, 15, 12, 10, 8, 6, 4, 2 for 8th. No points for fastest lap or pole position.

2007 Fórmula Renault Plus season
The last round was cancelled after the death of Gabriel Werner, brother of Mariano Werner (multiple champion in Formula Renault 1.6 Argentina) during the preparation of the Autódromo Oscar Cabalén venue with its team Recta Final Sport.

2007 Fórmula Renault Interprovencial season

2007 Fórmula 4 Nacional season
This is the first season of the Fórmula 4 Nacional series held on Argentina. Cars use Renault Clio K4M engine (1598cc) with lower power than the official 1.6L series. Teams can choose chassis manufacturer (Tulia, Tito...).
A Fórmula 4 Metropolitana was planned for the 2008 season.

References

External links
Formula Renault WSbR, Asia v6, Eurocup, UK, BARC, Italia, NEC and Asia: News, results, standings, entry and calendar formula3.cc

Renault
Formula Renault seasons